Glenn Stanford (born 1957) is a Canadian ice hockey executive. He is currently the Governor and Chief Operating Officer of the Newfoundland Growlers in the ECHL. Previously he served in that same capacity for the former St. John's IceCaps of the American Hockey League Stanford is a two-time winner of the James C. Hendy Memorial Award, which is awarded to the AHL Executive of the Year.

In June 2011, Stanford stepped away from his position as president of the Hamilton Bulldogs to accept the role of chief operating officer with the St. John's IceCaps. After the Ice Caps moved to Laval, Quebec to become the Laval Rocket, Stanford formed a group that successfully brought the ECHL to St. John's.

Awards and honours

References

External links
Glenn Stanford's staff profile at Eliteprospects.com

1957 births
Living people
American Hockey League
People from St. John's, Newfoundland and Labrador